Choti Choti Batain is a 2019 Pakistani anthology television series, created and developed by Shahzad Javed, Head of Content, HUM TV, co-produced by Momina Duraid of MD Productions and Angeline Malik.

The series is promoted as a collection of different stories for breaking stereotypes prevailing in the Pakistani society. Malik earlier announced the title of the series as Inkaar Karo which was later changed to Choti Choti Batain.

Premise

Story - 1

Story 2

Story 3

The story explores the life of single parents, how they feel when their children grow up and get busy with their lives. Saif (Osama Tahir) and Anaya (Hajra Yamin) are married couples living with Saif's father, Hassan (Sajid Hassan) while Sofia (Atiqa Odho) is the single mother of two daughters, Aliya (Mariyam Nafees) and Neha (Sukaina Khan). Slowly after their children's marriage, Hassan and Sofia realize what they are missing on; they crave companionship. Both by fate meet each other and ends up being a couple after a little family drama in both families.

Story 4

Story 5

Story 6

The story follows the life of Zeena (Amar Khan) who is a plain looking young woman from a middle-class family in Karachi. Zeena is a sincere worker. She is naive but intelligent. She has faced rejection largely from society simply because of her looks. Zeena somehow lands her dream job at Office. She is appointed as the assistant to Rehaan (Muneeb Butt) and after a rough start soon becomes indispensable at work. She falls in love with Rehaan but keeps her feelings to herself.

Cast

Story - 1 (Bandhan) 
Zahid Ahmed as Fahad
Yumna Zaidi as Bisma
Farah Shah as Salma; Fahad's mother
Saima Qureshi as Nayla; as Bisma's mother
Saife Hassan as Nasir; Bisma's father
Khalid Anam as Raza; Fahad's father

Story - 2 (Mujhay Tum Pasand Ho) 
Ushna Shah as Pareshay (Pari)
Mohsin Abbas Haider as Akaash 
Hina Dilpazeer as Akaash's mother
Shahood Alvi as Akaash's father
Shermeen Ali as Samiya
Fazila Qazi as Pari's mother
Sajid Shah as Pari's father
Ikram Abbasi as Umair

Story - 3 (Dil Hi Tou Hai) 
Atiqa Odho as Sofia Arif/Sofia Hassan
Mariyam Nafees as Aliya Raheel
Sukaina Khan as Neha Waqar	
Hajra Yamin as Anaya Saif
Osama Tahir as Saif Hassan
Saman Ansari as Shehnaz
Sajid Hassan as Hassan Ahmed

Story - 4 (Kuch Toh Log Kahenge) 
Kubra Khan as Sana
Shehzad Sheikh as Zain/Guddu
Saba Hameed as Shaista
Gul-e-Rana as Guddu's mother
Shehryar Zaidi as Taimoor
Ahson Talish as Ahmad

Story - 5 (Wajah Tum Ho) 
 Saheefa Jabbar Khattak as Hania
 Azfar Rehman as Sarim
 Hira Tareen as Nadia
 Tipu Sharif as Tanveer

Story - 6 (Roop) 
Amar Khan as Zeena 
Muneeb Butt
Mehmood Aslam
Lubna Aslam
Rubina Ashraf
Ghana Ali
Rabya Kulsoom
Sara Razi

Release
The series airs weekly on Hum TV every Sunday evening. It had been hiatus during Ramadan after Mujhay Tum Pasand Ho as the channel ran a transmission the whole day for the first time in years,  leaving space for very few serials in a week. It resumed with Dil Hi Toh Hai on 9 June 2019. Each episode of the drama has near one million or at least one million views on YouTube.

References

External links
Official website

Hum TV original programming
2019 Pakistani television series debuts
Urdu-language television shows
Television anthology episodes
Pakistani anthology television series
2019 Pakistani television series endings